Acrolocha is a genus of beetles belonging to the family Staphylinidae.

The genus was described in 1858 by Carl Gustaf Thomson.

he species of this genus are found in Eurasia and Northern America.

Species:
 Acrolocha minuta (Olivier & A.G., 1795)
 Acrolocha sulcula (Stephens, 1834)

References

Staphylinidae